Joe or Joseph Mooney may refer to:
 John Joseph Mooney (1874–1934), Irish nationalist politician
 Joseph Mooney (footballer) (fl. 1900s), English football player
 Joe Mooney (musician) (1911–1975), American jazz and pop accordionist
 Joe Mooney (politician) (1916–1988), Irish Fianna Fáil politician from County Leitrim
 Joseph Fraser Mooney (1927–2006), Canadian politician
 Joe Mooney (groundskeeper) (born 1930), American former groundskeeper for the Boston Red Sox
 Joseph Mooney (New Zealand politician) (born 1979)

See also
 Mooney